The MCB Tour Championship is a men's senior (over 50) professional golf tournament on the European Senior Tour. It has been held every year, in December, since 2009.

In 2009 and 2010 it was called the Mauritius Commercial Bank Open and was played at the start of the season, while from 2011 to 2017 it was the final event of the season. It was played at the Constance Belle Mare Plage in Mauritius. In 2017, the prize fund was €450,000.

In 2018 the Tour Championship consisted of two tournaments. The MCB Tour Championship Mauritius was played at Constance Belle Mare Plage followed by MCB Tour Championship Seychelles the following week, played at Constance Lemuria, Praslin Island, Seychelles. The 2019 Tour Championship was extended to three tournaments with an extra tournament at International Golf Club Du Rova near Antananarivo, Madagascar. The event in Madagascar followed by events in Seychelles and Mauritius.

The MCB Tour Championship was a continuation of the Seniors Tour Championship, which started in 2000 and was held in a number of countries (Abu Dhabi, Spain, Portugal, Bahrain and England) before moving to Mauritius in 2011.

Winners

Notes

External links
Coverage on the European Senior Tour's official site

European Senior Tour events
Golf tournaments in Mauritius
Recurring sporting events established in 2009
2009 establishments in Mauritius